McKinley School or McKinley Elementary School may refer to several primary-level schools in the United States:

 McKinley School (Columbus, Indiana), listed on the National Register of Historic Places (NRHP)
 McKinley Elementary School (Davenport, Iowa), NRHP-listed
 McKinley Elementary School (Muscatine, Iowa)
 McKinley School (Vassar, Michigan), listed on the NRHP in Tuscola County, Michigan
 McKinley Park School, Reno, Nevada, listed on the NRHP in Washoe County, Nevada
 McKinley Elementary School (Minot, North Dakota)
 McKinley School (Cincinnati, Ohio), NRHP-listed
 McKinley School (West Milton, Ohio), listed on the NRHP in Miami County, Ohio
 McKinley Elementary School (Redlands, California)
 McKinley Elementary School (Wyandotte, Michigan), listed on the NRHP in Wayne County, Michigan
 McKinley Primary Center (South Bend, IN)
 McKinley School (Parkersburg, WV)
McKinley Elementary School (Poland, OH)
McKinley School (Pasadena, CA) McKinley Elementary, K-8, Jr. High (1960's), Trade School (70's) https://www.pusd.us/Domain/25

See also 

 McKinley High School (disambiguation)